Sterigmostemum is a genus of flowering plants belonging to the family Brassicaceae.

Its native range is Turkey to Southwestern Siberia and Xinjiang.

Species:

Sterigmostemum acanthocarpum 
Sterigmostemum anchonioides 
Sterigmostemum billardierei 
Sterigmostemum caspicum 
Sterigmostemum elichrysifolium 
Sterigmostemum incanum 
Sterigmostemum longistylum 
Sterigmostemum ramosissimum 
Sterigmostemum schmakovii

References

Brassicaceae
Brassicaceae genera